Peña Trevinca, also known as Trevinca, is a mountain in northern Spain. It is located at the confluence of the Montes de León and the Macizo Galaico on the boundary between the autonomous communities of Galicia and Castile and León.  It is the highest mountain in Galicia and in the province of Zamora.

The mountain has a 22,510 ha bird-life Special Protection Area.

See also 
Serra do Eixe, also known as Sierra Segundera
Scrambling

References

External links
Macizo Galaico (Chain) - Hiking Geographic Card

Special Protection Areas of Spain
Galician Massif
Mountains of Castile and León
Mountains of Galicia (Spain)